Łódź Kaliska is one of the two main railway stations in the central Polish city of Łódź. It is located west of the center of the city, in the district of Polesie, and it consists of six platforms. The first complex of the station, designed by Polish architect Czesław Domaniewski, was built in 1902 in the style of Art Nouveau. Inside, there were several Art Nouveau elements, including crystal windows in doors, as well as brass fittings. The station served the Warsaw–Kalisz Railway, built between 1900 and 1902.

On 28 September 1946 a major rail accident occurred at the station, in which 21 people died. In 1994, a brand new complex of the Łódź Kaliska station was completed, and has been in use since then. The station provides connections to all major cities of Poland, including Warsaw, Kraków, Bydgoszcz, Katowice, Poznań, Wrocław, Szczecin, and Gdańsk, as well as Prague in the Czech Republic. The station is the terminus of Łódzka Kolej Aglomeracyjna (Łódź Commuter Railway), which serves towns in the Łódź region.

Public transit 
The station can be accessed by tram and bus lines:
 Bandurskiego - Dworzec Łódź Kaliska stop
 Trams:  10A, 10B, 12, 14, 18
 Buses: 6 (ZPK Markab), 65B, 80, 86A, 86B, 99
 Włókniarzy - Mickiewicza (Dworzec Łódź Kaliska) stop
 Trams: 8, 12
 Buses: 6 (ZPK Markab), 52, 65A, 80, 86A, 86B, 93, 99
 Włókniarzy - Karolewska (Dworzec Łódź Kaliska) stop
 Trams: 8, 16
 Buses: 65A, 80, 86A, 86B, 97A, 97B, 99
 Dworzec Łódź Kaliska bus terminus
 Buses: 6 (ZPK Markab), 52, 93, 97A, 97B

Train services
The station is served by the following services:

 Intercity services (IC) Łódź Fabryczna — Bydgoszcz — Gdynia Główna
Intercity services (IC) Gdynia - Gdańsk - Bydgoszcz - Toruń - Kutno - Łódź - Częstochowa - Katowice - Bielsko-Biała
 Intercity services (TLK) Gdynia Główna — Bydgoszcz/Grudziądz — Łódź — Katowice
 InterRegio services (IR) Łódź Kaliska — Warszawa Glowna 
 InterRegio services (IR) Ostrów Wielkopolski — Łódź — Warszawa Główna
 InterRegio services (IR) Poznań Główny — Ostrów Wielkopolski — Łódź — Warszawa Główna
 Regiona services (PR) Łódź Kaliska — Ostrów Wielkopolski 
 Regional services (PR) Łódź Kaliska — Ostrów Wielkopolski — Poznań Główny 
 Regional services (PR) Łódź Kaliska — Częstochowa 
 Regional services (PR) Łódź Kaliska — Skarżysko-Kamienna

Gallery

See also 
 Polish State Railways

References

External links 

 Schedule of the station - departures
 Photos of the station

Railway stations in Poland opened in 1902
Kaliska
Railway stations served by Przewozy Regionalne InterRegio
Railway stations served by Łódzka Kolej Aglomeracyjna